Kornel Hoffmann (born 24 April 1881, date of death unknown) was an Austrian footballer. He played in one match for the Austria national football team in 1904.

References

External links
 

1881 births
Year of death missing
Austrian footballers
Austria international footballers
Place of birth missing
Association footballers not categorized by position